It's You or No One is an album by American singer Bobby Darin, released in 1963.

Darin had left  Atco for Capitol records, but left this album unreleased since 1960. The first side was arranged by Torrie Zito, with the second arranged by Bobby Scott. The swinging first side makes little use of the brass section, while the slow second side has the feel of a chamber orchestra and no use of percussion at all. As with Darin's previous albums of standards, the album is a mix of well-known songs and obscurities, including three numbers written by Libby Holden, about whom very little is known.

Reception

In his Allmusic review, critic JT Griffith wrote "Like Love Swings, It's You or No One is upbeat first and melancholy "the morning after." ...the two make a great pair of conceptual love albums. Familiar territory for Darin, but filled with moving, solid interpretations."

The album received very little attention on initial release, with only Cash Box out of the trade magazines giving it a review, referring to it as a "sure-fire sales item."

Track listing
"It's You or No One" (Sammy Cahn, Jule Styne) – 3:25
"I Hadn't Anyone Till You" (Ray Noble) – 2:39
"Not Mine" (Johnny Mercer, Victor Schertzinger) – 2:09
"I Can't Believe That You're in Love with Me" (Clarence Gaskill, Jimmy McHugh) – 2:24
"I've Never Been in Love Before" (Frank Loesser) – 2:00
"All or Nothing at All" (Arthur Altman, Jack Lawrence) – 2:15
"Only One Little Item" (Libby Holden) – 3:58
"Don't Get Around Much Anymore" (Duke Ellington, Bob Russell) – 2:50
"How About Me?" (Irving Berlin) – 2:57
"I'll Be Around" (Alec Wilder) – 2:47
"All I Do Is Cry" (Libby Holden)  – 2:43
"I Guess I'm Good for Nothing But the Blues" (Libby Holden) – 3:24

Personnel
Bobby Darin – vocals
Torrie Zito – arranger, conductor
Bobby Scott – arranger, conductor

References

1963 albums
Bobby Darin albums
Atco Records albums